Jean-Pierre Milovanoff (born 1940, in Nîmes) is a French writer, laureate of several literary prizes

Milovanoff's father was born in Russia and left his country in 1919; His mother is of Provencal origin. He studied letters at Montpellier and at the Sorbonne. He is a radio producer at France Culture and lived successively in Paris, Montpellier and Copenhagen. His first novel La Fête interrompue was published in 1970. He wrote three collections of poems entitled Borgo Babylone, La Ballade du lépreux et Noir devant.

In 1997, Jean-Pierre Milovanoff received the prix Goncourt des lycéens for his novel le Maître des paons.

He resides in Génolhac.

Works 
Novels
1970: La Fête interrompue, éditions de Minuit
1978: Rempart mobile, éditions de Minuit
1993: L'Ouvreuse, éditions Julliard
1994: La Rosita, Julliard
1995: Russe blanc, Julliard
1996: La Splendeur d'Antonia, Julliard, Prix France Culture.
1997: Le Maître des paons, Julliard, Prix Goncourt des lycéens.
1999: L'Offrande sauvage, éditions Grasset, Prix des libraires.
2000: Auréline, Grasset
2002: La Mélancolie des innocents, Grasset, Prix France Télévisions.
2004: Dernier Couteau, Grasset
2005: Le Pays des vivants, Grasset
2006: Tout sauf un ange, Grasset
2008: Emily ou la déraison, Grasset
2009: L'Amour est un fleuve de Sibérie, Grasset
2011: Terreur grande, Grasset
2012: L’Hiver d'un égoïste et le Printemps qui en suivit, Grasset
2014: Le Visiteur aveugle, Grasset
2015: Le Mariage de Pavel, Grasset

Theatre
1988: Squatt, éditions Comp'Act
1990: Le Roi d'Islande, éditions Comp'Act
1990: Side-car, éditions Comp'Act
1995: Cinquante mille nuits d’amour, éditions Julliard
1997: Ange des peupliers, éditions Julliard

Essay
1998: Presque un manège, éditions Julliard

Poetry
1997: Borgo Babylone, éditions Unes
1997: Une petite main, éditions Unes
1998: La Ballade du lépreux, éditions Unes
2004: Noir Devant, éditions Seghers

Books for children
2002: Les Sifflets de monsieur Babouch, éditions Actes Sud-Papiers
2006: Clam la rapide, éditions du Seuil
2008: La Carpe de tante Gobert, éditions Acte Sud-Papiers

Bibliography

References

External links 
 Jean-Pierre Milovanoff on Babelio
  Jean-Pierre Milovanoff raconte  la solitude de son père, cet exilé on Le Temps
 Site of Jean-Pierre Milovanoff 
 Littérature : le Génolhacois Jean-Pierre Milovanoff sort son dernier ouvrage on France Bleu
 Jean-Pierre Milovanoff on France Culture

21st-century French non-fiction writers
20th-century French dramatists and playwrights
20th-century French poets
French children's writers
French radio producers
Prix des libraires winners
Prix France Culture winners
Prix Goncourt des lycéens winners
1940 births
People from Nîmes
Living people
Radio France people